Malfi may refer to:

 Amalfi, a town and comune in Italy
 Duchy of Amalfi, an independent state centered on Amalfi during the 10th and 11th centuries
 Ronald Malfi (born 1977), American novelist
 Serena Malfi (born 1985), Italian operatic mezzosoprano

See also
 The Duchess of Malfi (disambiguation)